Rick Hart is an American sound engineer. He was nominated for an Academy Award in the category Best Sound for the film Under Siege. He has worked on more than 70 films since 1988.

Selected filmography
 Under Siege (1992)

References

External links

Year of birth missing (living people)
Living people
American audio engineers